2014 Cambodian League is the 30th season of the Cambodian League.

Teams
 Albirex Niigata Phnom Penh
 Asia Europe University
 Boeung Ket
 Build Bright United
 Kirivong Sok Sen Chey
 Naga Corp
 National Defense
 National Police Commissary
 Phnom Penh Crown
 Svay Rieng
 TriAsia
 Western University

Foreign players

The number of foreign players is restricted to five per team. A team can use three foreign players on the field in each game.

Regular stage

Top scorers

Awards

References

C-League seasons
Cambodia
Cambodia
1